16 Lacertae is a triple star system in the northern constellation of Lacerta, located about 1,580 light years from the Sun. It has the variable star designation EN Lacertae; 16 Lacertae is the Flamsteed designation. This system is visible to the naked eye as a faint blue-white hued star with a maximum apparent visual magnitude of +5.587. It is moving closer to the Earth with a heliocentric radial velocity of –12 km/s.

The binary nature of the brighter component was discovered in 1910 by astronomer Oliver J. Lee at Yerkes Observatory. The first orbital elements were published by Otto Struve and Nicholay T. Bobrovnikov in 1925. This is a single-lined spectroscopic binary with an orbital period of 12.1 days and a small eccentricity of 0.05. It forms an eclipsing binary variable, although only the eclipse of the primary component has been detected. This component is a Beta Cephei variable star with three dominant pulsation modes having frequencies of around six per day. It has a stellar classification of B2 IV, matching a B-type subgiant star with 9.5 times the mass of the Sun and 5.6 times the Sun's radius.

The unseen secondary is an F-type star of class F6–7. The tertiary component is a magnitude 11.4 star with a class of F0.

References

B-type subgiants
Beta Cephei variables
Eclipsing binaries
Spectroscopic binaries
Triple star systems
Lacerta (constellation)
Lacertae, 16
Durchmusterung objects
216916
113281
8725
Lacertae, EN